Hestbrepiggene or Hestbreapiggan is a mountain ridge on the border of Skjåk Municipality and Lom Municipality in Innlandet county, Norway. The mountain is surrounded by several other notable mountains including Hesthøi to the northeast, Storhøi to the east; Merrahøi, Svartdalshøi, and Steindalshøi to the southwest; Holåtindan and Vesldalstinden to the west; Gjelhøi to the northwest; and Låven and Hestdalshøgdi to the north.

See also
List of mountains of Norway

References

Skjåk
Lom, Norway
Mountains of Innlandet